Cameron Vickers (born November 26, 1988) is an American soccer player.

External links
 USL Pro profile
 

1988 births
Living people
American soccer players
Seattle Sounders FC U-23 players
Portland Timbers U23s players
Phoenix FC players
Dayton Dutch Lions players
Phoenix Rising FC players
Penn FC players
Soccer players from Washington (state)
USL League Two players
USL Championship players
Association football midfielders
National Premier Soccer League players
National Independent Soccer Association players
Philadelphia Fury players
Richmond Kickers players
One Knoxville SC players